Garden leave (also known as gardening leave) is the practice whereby an employee leaving a job – having resigned or otherwise had their employment terminated – is instructed to stay away from work during the notice period, while still remaining on the payroll. This practice is often used to prevent an employee from taking with them up-to-date (and perhaps sensitive) information when they leave their current employer, especially when they are very likely leaving to join a competitor. In jurisdictions where employee non-compete clauses are legal, the practice is used to maintain the effectiveness of such clauses. This is also sometimes used when an employee position is no longer needed during the notice period. Sometimes, the practice is used to avoid lackadaisical work or sabotage by an uninterested or disaffected employee, or when an employer wishes to imply that is the case.

The term can also refer to the case of an employee sent home pending disciplinary proceeding, when they are between projects, or when, as a result of publicity, their presence at work is considered counter-productive. It has also been used in British football.

Employees continue to receive their normal pay during garden leave and must adhere to their conditions of employment, such as confidentiality and non-compete clause, at least until their notice period expires. A similar practice applies in the United States where an employee (typically a high-ranking executive) that is immediately relieved of responsibilities usually remains with the company as a consultant (special adviser) for the remainder of their contract, continuing to receive a salary and office during that period.

Etymology 
The term originated in the British civil service, where employees had the right to request special leave for exceptional purposes. "Gardening leave" became a euphemism for "suspended" as an employee who was formally suspended pending an investigation into their conduct would often request to be out of the office on special leave instead. The term came to widespread public attention in 1986 when it was used in the BBC sitcom Yes, Prime Minister episode "One of Us" and in Silent Witness season 18, regarding Officer Carl Parry.

See also
Employment contract
Administrative leave

References 

Leave of absence
United Kingdom labour law